A Hundred Miles or More: A Collection is a compilation album by country/bluegrass artist Alison Krauss. It was released on April 3, 2007, and is a collection of new and old songs that Krauss has recorded. It features duets with Sting, Brad Paisley, John Waite, and James Taylor. The album debuted and peaked at No. 10 on the U.S. Billboard 200, No. 3 on the U.S. Top Country Albums, and No. 38 on the UK Albums Chart.

Two singles were released from the album: a cover version of "Missing You" by John Waite, which reached No. 34 on the Hot Country Songs chart, and "Simple Love", which did not chart. One of the previously released tracks, How's The World Treating You, a duet with James Taylor, had won the Best Country Collaboration with Vocals at the 46th Grammy Awards.

Track listing
"You're Just a Country Boy" (Fred Hellerman, Marshall Barer)
previously unreleased
"Simple Love" (Sarah Siskind)
previously unreleased    
"Jacob's Dream" (Julie Lee, John Pennell)
the story of the Lost Children of the Alleghenies
previously unreleased
"Away Down the River" (Julie Lee)
previously unreleased
"Sawing on the Strings" (Lewis Compton)
previously unreleased
"Down to the River to Pray" (Traditional)
from O Brother, Where Art Thou soundtrack
"Baby Mine" (Ned Washington, Frank Churchill)
from The Best of Country Sing the Best of Disney
"Molly Bán (Bawn)" (Paddy Moloney)
featuring The Chieftains 
from The Chieftains' Down the Old Plank Road: The Nashville Sessions 
"How's the World Treating You" (Chet Atkins, Boudleaux Bryant)  
featuring James Taylor
from Livin', Lovin', Losin': Songs of The Louvin Brothers
"The Scarlet Tide" (Elvis Costello, T Bone Burnett)
from Cold Mountain soundtrack
"Whiskey Lullaby" (Bill Anderson, Jon Randall)
featuring Brad Paisley
from Brad Paisley's "Mud on the Tires"
"You Will Be My Ain True Love" (Sting)
featuring Sting   
from Cold Mountain soundtrack
"I Give You to His Heart" (Ron Block)
from The Prince of Egypt: Nashville
"Get Me Through December" (Gordie Sampson, Fred Lavery)
featuring Natalie MacMaster
From Natalie MacMaster's In My Hands
"Missing You" (John Waite, Mark Leonard, Charles Sanford)
featuring John Waite 
From John Waite's Downtown: Journey of a Heart
"Lay Down Beside Me" (Don Williams)
featuring John Waite
previously unreleased

Personnel
 Alison Krauss – vocals, backing vocals, fiddle, producer
 Guitar – B. James Lowry, Bill Piburn, Brad Paisley, Carl Jackson, Dan Tyminski, Gordie Sampson, Jerry Douglas, Mike Johnson, Michael Spriggs, Ron Block, Stuart Duncan, Tom Bukovac, Tony Rice
 Bass guitar, double bass – Barry Bales, Abraham Laboriel, Dennis Crouch, Viktor Krauss, Kevin Grantt
 Keyboards – Catherine Marx, Gordon Mote, Jim Cox, Keefus Ciancia, Matt Rollings, Scott Baggett
 Drums, percussion – Larry Atamanuik, Abraham Laboriel, Andy Peake, Ben Sesar, Eric Darken, Harry Stinson, Greg Morrow, Tony Creasman, Kenny Malone, Shannon Forrest 
 Vocals, backing vocals – Brad Paisley, Cheryl White, Dub Cornett, Dan Tyminski, David Rawlings, Gillian Welch, James Taylor, John Waite, Maura O'Connell, Norman Blake, Pat Enright, Porter McLister, Ron Block, Sam Bush, Sam Phillips, Sting, Tim O'Brien
 Banjo –  Béla Fleck 
 Dulcimer – David Schnaufer
 Mandolin – Dan Tyminski, Sam Bush, Stuart Duncan, Bryan Sutton 
 Mandola – Adam Steffey
 Cello – Martin Tillman, Chris Carmichael
 Fiddle – Natalie MacMaster, Justin Williamson
 Guitar - Jeff White

Chart performance

Weekly charts

Year-end charts

Singles

Certifications and sales

References

Alison Krauss & Union Station albums
2007 compilation albums
Rounder Records compilation albums